Birinci Çaylı (also, Çaylı, Chayly, Chayly Pervyy, and Chayly Pervyye) is a village and municipality in the Shamakhi Rayon of Azerbaijan.  It has a population of 1,686.

References 

Populated places in Shamakhi District